Kalod is a village located in Siwani Tehsil and Bhiwani District, 12 kilometers from Siwani Tehsil and 55 kilometers from District Headquarters, as per the 2011 census the population of the village is close to 4500 and the village has a total of 2200 voters, Kalod. The village is mainly dependent on farming, 80% of its population work in agriculture, many of whom rear cows and buffaloes. Many people of the village have contributed to the service of the country and have also served in the Indian Army and many people of the village do business in different cities of the country, which is a matter of pride for the village.

People of many castes live in the village, including Brahmin, Pilania, Babal, Mantri, Saharan, Khati and Kumhar.

Kalod has 3 government schools
 

The Many Places & Mandir's in kalod.

References

Villages in Bhiwani district